In an effort to bring together pages on various religions, below is a list of articles that are about or reference Latter Day Saint movement topics.

As a rule, the links below should direct to existing articles, not empty pages (non-existent articles), or off-site web pages. If an article is needed, please create a Stub and/or leave a request for additional information on Talk:List of Latter Day Saint movement topics.

Supercategories of the Latter Day Saint movement
Christianity, Gospel, Religion, Religion in the United States, Restorationism (Christian primitivism)

Latter Day Saint movement in general, as a religion or group of religions
Church of Christ (Latter Day Saints), Latter-day Saint, Latter Day Saint, Latter Day Saint movement, The Church of Jesus Christ of Latter-day Saints membership statistics, Mormon, Mormonism, Mormonism and Christianity, Mormonism and Freemasonry, Mormonism and Judaism, Mormon studies, Saint

Latter Day Saint denominations
A to M: Aaronic Order, Apostolic United Brethren, Church of Christ (Cutlerite), Church of Christ (Temple Lot), Church of Christ (Whitmerite), Church of Jesus Christ of Latter Day Saints (Strangite), Church of Jesus Christ, the Bride, the Lamb's Wife, Church of Christ with the Elijah Message, Community of Christ, Fundamentalist Church of Jesus Christ of Latter Day Saints, Kingston clan

N to Z: Remnant Church of Jesus Christ of Latter Day Saints, Restoration Church of Jesus Christ, Restoration Church of Jesus Christ of Latter Day Saints, Restored Church of Jesus Christ, Rigdonite, The Church of Jesus Christ, The Church of Jesus Christ of Latter-day Saints, True Church of Jesus Christ of Latter Day Saints, True and Living Church of Jesus Christ of Saints of the Last Days

Organizations related to the Latter Day Saint movement
Bonneville International, Brigham Young University, Deseret Book, Deseret Management Corporation, Deseret Morning News, Excel Entertainment Group, Foundation for Ancient Research and Mormon Studies (FARMS), Intellectual Reserve, John Whitmer Historical Association, JustServe, KSL-TV, Mormon History Association, Mormon Historic Sites Foundation, Mormon apologetics, Ordain Women, Signature Books

Topics that reference the Latter Day Saint movement
Accounts of pre-mortal existence, Baptismal clothing, Beehive#Symbolism, Breastplate, Christian countercult movement, Christian denominations, Cunning folk, Fate of the unlearned, Henotheism, Millerites, Religious perspectives on Jesus, Survivalism, Temple robes, Urim and Thummim, Whore of Babylon

Latter Day Saint doctrines, beliefs, and practices
A to M: Adamic language, Animals in the Church of Jesus Christ of Latter-day Saints, Angel, Authority and the Church of Jesus Christ of Latter-day Saints, Black people, Blood atonement, Celestial Kingdom, Chastity, Chosen people, Christian eschatology, Christian view of marriage, City of Zion (Mormonism), Continuous revelation, Ecumenical council, Exaltation (Mormonism), Ex-Mormon, Excommunication, Evolution, Fast Sunday, fast offering, Gender identity, Gentile, Gifts of the Spirit in Mormonism, Great and abominable church, Great Apostasy, Holy of Holies (Latter Day Saints), Homosexuality, Interracial marriage, Israelite, Kolob, Marriage, Masturbation, Mormon fundamentalism

N to Z:  Native Americans in the United States, Outer darkness, Phrenology and the Latter Day Saint Movement, Plan of Salvation (Latter Day Saints), Polygamy, Pre-Columbian trans-oceanic contact, Pre-existence, Restoration (Mormonism), Revelation (Latter Day Saints), Satan, Seer stone (Latter Day Saints), Separation of church and state, Sexuality and Mormonism, Solemn assembly, Son of perdition (Mormonism), Spiritual wifery, Telestial Kingdom, Temple garment, Terrestrial Kingdom, Testimony, Urim and Thummim (Latter Day Saints), Word of Wisdom, Word of Wisdom (Latter-day Saint)

Latter Day Saint doctrines regarding deity
Adam-God theory, Creator god, Elohim, Exaltation (LDS Church), God, God the Father, Godhead (Christianity), Godhead (Mormonism), Heavenly Mother, Henotheism, Holy Spirit, Jesus, Jesus Christ as the Messiah, Jesus in the Church of Jesus Christ of Latter-day Saints, Nontrinitarianism, Omnipotence, Trinity, Divinization (Christian)

Latter Day Saint ordinances, rituals, and symbolism
Anointing of the Sick, Baptism for the dead, Baptism in Mormonism, Blood atonement, Eternal Marriage, Marriage, Infant baptism#Denominations and religious groups opposed to infant baptism, light of Christ (Latter Day Saints), Ordinance (Mormonism), Patriarchal blessing, Rebaptism (Mormonism), Sacrament meeting, Sacrament (Mormonism), Sealing (Latter Day Saints), Second anointing, Temple, Temple (Latter Day Saints), Temple (LDS Church), Temple architecture (LDS Church)

Latter-day Saint religious clothing
Baptismal clothing, CTR ring, Temple garment, Temple robes, Veil, White clothing (religious)

Latter Day Saint hierarchy
A to M: Aaronic priesthood (Latter Day Saints), Anointed Quorum, Apostle (Latter Day Saints), Apostolic succession, Bishop (Latter Day Saints), Chapel, Choir, Church of Christ (Latter Day Saints), Clergy, Deacon (Latter Day Saints), Elder (Latter Day Saints), First Presidency, General authority, High council (Latter Day Saints), High priest (Latter Day Saints), Melchizedek priesthood (Latter Day Saints), Missionary (LDS Church)

N to Z: Patriarch (Latter Day Saints), Patriarchal priesthood, Presiding bishop, Presiding Patriarch, President of the Church, President of the Quorum of the Twelve, Priest (Latter Day Saints), Priesthood (Latter Day Saints), Priesthood Correlation Program, Primary (LDS Church), Prophet, seer, and revelator, Quorum (Latter Day Saints), Quorum of the Twelve, Quorums of the Seventy, Relief Society, Stake (Latter Day Saints), Teacher (Latter Day Saints), Ward (LDS Church), World Church Leadership Council

General Conferences of The Church of Jesus Christ of Latter-day Saints
Conference Center (LDS Church), General Conference (LDS Church)

Mormonism and controversy
Anti-Mormonism, Black people and Mormonism, Controversies regarding The Church of Jesus Christ of Latter-day Saints, Common Latter-day Saint perceptions, Cultural Mormon, Jack Mormons, LGBT Mormon suicides, Mormonism Unvailed, Ordain Women, US politics and the LDS Church, Search for the Truth (video), The God Makers (film), The God Makers II

LDS Doctrines concerning the afterlife

Plan of salvation (Latter Day Saints), Degrees of glory

Latter Day Saint texts
Account of John, Apocrypha, Articles of Faith (Latter Day Saints), Articles of the Church of Christ, Book of Abraham, Book of Commandments, Book of Joseph, Book of Mormon, Book of Moses, Doctrine and Covenants, Encyclopedia of Mormonism, The Family: A Proclamation to the World, Jesus the Christ (book), Joseph Smith–History, Joseph Smith–Matthew, Joseph Smith Papyri, King Follett Discourse, Kirtland Egyptian Papers, Lectures on Faith, Nauvoo Expositor, Peace Maker (pamphlet), Pearl of Great Price (Mormonism), Sacred text, Scriptures, Sefer haYashar (midrash), Standard Works, The Wentworth Letter, The Word of the Lord Brought to Mankind by an Angel, Word of Wisdom

Latter Day Saint movement and the Bible
Bible, Biblical canon, Joseph Smith Translation of the Bible, King-James-Only Movement, King James Version of the Bible, Makhshava, New Testament, Old Testament

Book of Mormon
Book of Mormon, Book of Mormon chronology, Curelom, Gadianton robbers, Egbert Bratt Grandin, Egyptian Names in the Book of Mormon, Paanchi (Book of Mormon), Record of the Nephites, Secret combination (Latter Day Saints), Sword of Laban

Book of Mormon people
Ammaron, Ammon (Book of Mormon), Book of Mormon rulers, Captain Moroni, Coriantumr, Enos (Book of Mormon), Ether (Book of Mormon), Gadianton robbers, Ishmael (Book of Mormon), Jaredite, Joseph (Book of Mormon), King Noah, Korihor, Laban (Book of Mormon), Laman and Lemuel, Lamanites, Lamoni, Limhi, List of Book of Mormon groups, List of Book of Mormon people, King Mosiah I, King Mosiah II, Mulek, Nephite, Paanchi (Book of Mormon), Sam (Book of Mormon), Sariah, Sons of Mosiah, Various Book of Mormon people, Zedekiah, Zeniff, Zenock, Zenos, Zoram

Book of Mormon artifacts
Breastplate, Cunning Folk Traditions and the Latter Day Saint Movement, Liahona (Book of Mormon), Rameumptom, Seer stones in Mormonism, Urim and Thummim

Book of Mormon places

Bountiful (Book of Mormon), Khirbet Beit Lehi, Lehi-Nephi, Nahom, Zarahemla

Book of Mormon prophets
Abinadi, Alma the Elder, Alma the Younger, Ether (Book of Mormon), Helaman, Helaman, son of Helaman, Jacob (Book of Mormon), Jarom, King Benjamin, Lehi (Book of Mormon), List of Book of Mormon prophets, Mahonri Moriancumer, Mormon (prophet), Nephi, son of Lehi, Omni (Book of Mormon), Samuel the Lamanite, Zenos, Zenock

Book of Mormon studies
Archaeology and the Book of Mormon, Foundation for Ancient Research and Mormon Studies, Genetics and the Book of Mormon, Golden Plates, Limited geography model (Book of Mormon), Linguistics and the Book of Mormon, Reformed Egyptian, Studies of the Book of Mormon, The Book of Mormon and the King James Bible

Books of the Book of Mormon
Lost 116 pages, First Book of Nephi, Second Book of Nephi, Book of Jacob, Book of Enos, Book of Jarom, Book of Omni, Words of Mormon, Book of Mosiah, Book of Alma, Book of Helaman, Third Book of Nephi, Fourth Book of Nephi, Book of Mormon (Mormon's record), Book of Ether, Book of Moroni, Large Plates of Nephi, Small Plates of Nephi

Latter Day Saint periodicals
Dialogue: A Journal of Mormon Thought, Elders' Journal, Ensign (LDS magazine), Evening and Morning Star, The Friend (Mormon magazine), Journal of Discourses, Liahona (magazine), List of Latter Day Saint periodicals, Messenger and Advocate, Millennial Star, New Era (magazine), Prophwyd y Jubili, Relief Society Magazine, The Seer (periodical), Sunstone Magazine, Times and Seasons, Udgorn Seion, Woman's Exponent

History of the Latter Day Saint movement
Dates: 1831 polygamy revelation, 1843 polygamy revelation, 1890 Manifesto

A to M:  Amboy Conference, Authoritarianism and Mormonism, Battle Creek, Utah, Blacks and Mormonism, Burned-over district, Cart, BYU LGBT history, Council of Fifty, Culture of the United States, Danite, Deseret (Book of Mormon), Deseret alphabet, Execution by firing squad, Extermination Order (Mormonism), First Transcontinental Railroad (North America), First Vision, Forgery, Mormon War (1838)#Gallatin Election Day Battle, Haun's Mill Massacre, History of Christianity, History of the Americas, History of the United States, History of the Church of Jesus Christ of Latter-day Saints, History of the Latter Day Saint movement, Honeybee, Indian Placement Program, The Joseph Smith Papers, Joshua tree, Kirtland Safety Society, LGBT Mormon history timeline, Miracle of the Gulls, Mormon Battalion, Mormon handcart pioneers, Mormon pioneers, Mormon Reformation, Mormon Trail, Mormon War (1838), Mormonism and women, Mountain Meadows Massacre

N to Z: Nauvoo Expositor, Nauvoo Legion, Persecution of Christians, Polygamy, Priesthood Correlation Program, Rigdon's July 4th oration, Salamander Letter, Salt Sermon, School of the Prophets, Second Great Awakening, Short Creek raid, Succession crisis (Latter Day Saints), United States religious history University of Deseret, Utah War, Zelph, Zion's Camp

Significant dates in the Latter Day Saint movement
 December 23, 1805 - birth of Joseph Smith
 Spring of 1820 - Joseph Smith, age 14, was visited by God the Father and His Son, Jesus Christ
 September 21, 1823 - Moroni The Angel visits Joseph Smith
 September 22, 1823 - Joseph Smith is shown the gold plates for the first time
 January 18, 1827 - Joseph Smith marries Emma Hale.
 September 22, 1827 - Joseph Smith receives the gold plates.
 May 15, 1829 - John The Baptist The Angel bestows the Aaron Priesthood upon Joseph Smith and Oliver Cowdery
 June 1829 - Peter James and John The Angels bestow the Melchizedek Priesthood upon Joseph Smith and Oliver Cowdery
 March 26, 1830 - 5,000 copies of the Book of Mormon published in Palmyra, New York
 April 6, 1830 - Church of Jesus Christ of Latter-day Saints founded in Fayette, New York
 July 17, 1831 - The 1831 polygamy revelation in which Christ commands Smith's followers to take “wives of the Lamanites and Nephites [Native Americans].”
 1832
 November 13, 1838 - birth of Joseph Fielding Smith
 July 12, 1843 - The 1843 polygamy revelation in which Christ commands polygamy in a “new and an everlasting covenant.”
 June 27, 1844 - Joseph and Hyrum Smith murdered in Carthage Jail, in Carthage, Illinois
 August 8, 1844 - Quorum of Twelve is created as the leading body of the church.
 February 10, 1846 - Many Mormons begin their migration from Nauvoo, Illinois to Great Salt Lake
 July 24, 1847 - Brigham Young arrives in Salt Lake Valley; Salt Lake City established
 1857 - Mormons abandon Las Vegas
 October 6, 1890 - Wilford Woodruff issues the "1890 Manifesto" halting polygamy.
 1904 - Joseph F. Smith issues a "Second Manifesto" against polygamy

Significant places in the Latter Day Saint movement
A to M:  Adam-ondi-Ahman, Alberta, Arizona, Auditorium (Community of Christ), Beaver Island (Lake Michigan), Brigham Young University, Brigham Young University–Hawaii, Brigham Young University Jerusalem Center, Burlington, Wisconsin, Caldwell County, Missouri, Chihuahua (state), Church Office Building, Conference Center (LDS Church), Culture of Mexico, Davis County, Utah, Demographics of Greece, Demographics of Kiribati, Demographics of Mexico, Demographics of Niue, Demographics of Palau, Demographics of Swaziland, Demographics of the Marshall Islands, Downtown (Salt Lake City), Endowment House, Far West, Missouri, Finger Lakes, Fort Bridger, Hiram, Ohio, Independence, Missouri, Jackson County, Missouri, Kane County, Utah, Kirtland, Ohio, Lā'ie, Hawai'i, Las Vegas, Nevada, Los Angeles, California, Missouri, Morgan County, Utah

N to Z: Nauvoo, Illinois, Palmyra, Platte River, Rich County, Utah, Salt Lake Assembly Hall, Salt Lake City, Utah, San Bernardino, California, Seagull Monument, Sharon, Vermont, State of Deseret, St. James Township, Michigan, Temple Lot, Temple Square, University of Utah, Utah, Utah Territory, Voree, Wisconsin, Zion (Latter Day Saints)

Latter Day Saint temples
A to M: Apia Samoa Temple, Atlanta Georgia Temple, Bern Switzerland Temple, Cardston Alberta Temple, Chicago Illinois Temple, Freiberg Germany Temple, Guayaquil Ecuador Temple, Hamilton New Zealand Temple, Hong Kong China Temple, Houston Texas Temple, Idaho Falls Idaho Temple, Independence temple, Jordan River Utah Temple, Kirtland Temple, Kona Hawaii Temple, Laie Hawaii Temple, Las Vegas Nevada Temple, Logan Utah Temple, London England Temple, Los Angeles California Temple, Manti Utah Temple, Mesa Arizona Temple

N to Z: Nauvoo Illinois Temple, Nauvoo Temple, Oakland California Temple, Ogden Utah Temple, Orlando Florida Temple, Nuku alofa Tonga Temple, Provo Utah Temple, Raleigh North Carolina Temple, Salt Lake Temple, São Paulo Brazil Temple, Seattle Washington Temple, St. George Utah Temple, Tokyo Japan Temple, Vernal Utah Temple, Washington, D.C. Temple

Latter Day Saints
 List of Latter-day Saints
 Black Mormons
 LGBTQ Mormon people
 A – M: Nephi Anderson, Billy Barty, Earl W. Bascom, Glenn Beck, Steve Benson (cartoonist), Don Bluth, Shawn Bradley, Hugh B. Brown, Orson Scott Card, James C. Christensen, Kresimir Cosik, Stephen Covey, Mitch Davis, Richard Dutcher, Aaron Eckhart, Philo Farnsworth, Brandon Flowers, Rulon Gardner, Marvin Goldstein, Bo Gritz, Orrin Hatch, Jon Heder, Jared Hess, Ken Jennings, Steven E. Jones, Kate Kelly (feminist), Gladys Knight, Glen A. Larson, Michael O. Leavitt, Jon Peter Lewis, Robert L. Millet, Dale Murphy,
 N – Z: Donny Osmond, Marie Osmond, Olive Osmond, Anne Perry, Sandy Petersen, William Wines Phelps, D. Michael Quinn, Carmen Rasmusen, Harry Reid, Mitt Romney, Elizabeth Smart (Elizabeth Smart kidnapping), Benjamin Urrutia, Olene S. Walker, Steve Young (American football),
 Groups: Jericho Road, The Osmonds, The Lettermen, The Jets

Historians of the Latter Day Saint movement
 Church Historian and Recorder, Latter Day Saint Historians,
 A – M: Thomas G. Alexander, Edward H. Anderson, Nephi Anderson, Leonard J. Arrington, Valeen Tippetts Avery, Philip Barlow, Davis Bitton, Fawn M. Brodie, Juanita Brooks, Richard Bushman, Todd Compton, Ron Esplin, Dean C. Jessee, H. Michael Marquardt, Armand Mauss, Dean Lowe May, Dale Morgan,
 N – Z: Linda King Newell, Hugh Nibley, Grant H. Palmer, Gregory Prince, D. Michael Quinn, B. H. Roberts, Stephen E. Robinson, Jan Shipps, Linda Sillitoe, Wallace Stegner, Jerald and Sandra Tanner, Dan Vogel, Wesley P. Walters, Wm. Robert Wright
 Groups or Organizations: Foundation for Ancient Research and Mormon Studies, John Whitmer Historical Association, Mormon Historic Sites Foundation, Mormon History Association, September Six,

Notable people in Latter Day Saint history
 A – M: Leonard J. Arrington, Valeen Tippetts Avery, Earl W. Bascom, Lilburn Boggs, Gutzon Borglum, Fawn M. Brodie, Juanita Brooks, John Browning, Butch Cassidy, William Henry Chamberlin (philosopher), J. Reuben Clark, Kresimir Cosik, Henry Eyring (Mormon convert), Mark Hofmann, Sonia Johnson, Gordon Jump, Thomas L. Kane, Kate Kelly (feminist), Gladys Knight, Jesse Knight, O. Raymond Knight, William Law (Mormonism), Mark Madsen,
 N – Z: Hugh Nibley, Marie Osmond, Natacha Rambova, Stephen E. Robinson, William Shunn, Jerald and Sandra Tanner, Bertel Thorvaldsen
 Groups: September Six,

Mormon pioneers 
 Mormon handcart pioneers
 Mormon pioneers
 Mormon Trail
 Perpetual Emigration Fund
 A – M: Elijah Abel, Milo Andrus, Truman O. Angell, Israel Barlow, John Milton Bernhisel, Samuel Brannan, George Q. Cannon, Martha Hughes Cannon, Albert Carrington, Zebedee Coltrin, William Clayton (Latter Day Saints), Joseph Fielding, William Harrison Folsom, Emma Lee French, Archibald Gardner, William S. Godbe, Henry Grow, Ephraim Hanks, "Wild Bill" Hickman, Jefferson Hunt, Orson Hyde, William B. Ide, Luke S. Johnson, Heber C. Kimball, Helen Mar Kimball, Dudley Leavitt, John D. Lee, Walker Lewis, Francis M. Lyman, Isaac Morley
 N – Z: Orson Pratt, Parley P. Pratt, Franklin D. Richards (Mormon apostle), Willard Richards, Brigham Henry Roberts, Porter Rockwell, Charles Roscoe Savage, Bathsheba W. Smith, Joseph F. Smith, Lot Smith, Mary Fielding Smith, Abraham O. Smoot, Eliza Roxcy Snow, Erastus Snow, Lorenzo Snow, Orson Spencer, Edward Stevenson, Levi Stewart, John Taylor (1808-1887), Moses Thatcher, David King Udall, John Van Cott, Daniel H. Wells, Wilford Woodruff, Brigham Young, Brigham Young, Jr., Zina D. H. Young,

Latter Day Saint leaders
 A – M: Elijah Abel, Milo Andrus, Jason W. Briggs, Hugh B. Brown, Zebedee Coltrin, Oliver Cowdery, Alpheus Cutler, W. A. Draves, Otto Fetting, Zenos H. Gurley, Sr., Martin Harris (Latter Day Saints), George M. Hinkle, Milton R. Hunter, J. Golden Kimball, William Law (Mormonism), John D. Lee, Rex E. Lee, Walker Lewis, William Marks (Mormonism), William E. McLellin,
 N – Z: Warren Parrish, William Wines Phelps, Sidney Rigdon, Brigham Henry Roberts, Alexander Hale Smith, Bathsheba W. Smith, Emma Hale Smith, Frederick Madison Smith, Hyrum Smith, Joseph Smith, Sr., Joseph Smith, Jr., Joseph Smith III, Eliza Roxcy Snow, James Strang, Levi Stewart, David Whitmer, John Whitmer, Elizabeth Ann Whitney, Benjamin Winchester, Zina D. H. Young

Presidents of The Church of Jesus Christ of Latter-day Saints
 President of the Church (LDS Church)
 A – M: Ezra Taft Benson, Heber J. Grant, Gordon B. Hinckley, Howard W. Hunter, Spencer W. Kimball, Harold B. Lee, David O. McKay, Thomas S. Monson,
 N – Z: George Albert Smith, Joseph Smith, Jr., Joseph F. Smith, Joseph Fielding Smith, Lorenzo Snow, John Taylor (1808-1887), Wilford Woodruff, Brigham Young

Apostles of The Church of Jesus Christ of Latter-day Saints
 Quorum of the Twelve Apostles (LDS Church)
 A – M: Marvin J. Ashton, M. Russell Ballard, David A. Bednar, Ezra T. Benson, Ezra Taft Benson, Albert E. Bowen, Hugh B. Brown, George Q. Cannon, D. Todd Christofferson, J. Reuben Clark, Quentin L. Cook, Richard L. Evans, Henry B. Eyring, James E. Faust, Heber J. Grant, David B. Haight, Robert D. Hales, Alonzo A. Hinckley, Gordon B. Hinckley, Jeffrey R. Holland, Howard W. Hunter, Orson Hyde, Anthony W. Ivins, Luke S. Johnson, Heber C. Kimball, Spencer W. Kimball, Harold B. Lee, Thomas B. Marsh, Bruce R. McConkie, David O. McKay, Thomas S. Monson,
 N – Z: Russell M. Nelson, Dallin H. Oaks, Boyd K. Packer, David W. Patten, L. Tom Perry, Mark E. Petersen, Orson Pratt, Parley P. Pratt, Willard Richards, Richard G. Scott, George A. Smith, George Albert Smith, Hyrum Smith, Hyrum Mack Smith, Joseph F. Smith, Joseph Fielding Smith, William Smith (Latter Day Saints), Reed Smoot, Lorenzo Snow, John Taylor (Mormon), John Whittaker Taylor, George Teasdale, Dieter F. Uchtdorf, Daniel H. Wells, Joseph B. Wirthlin, Wilford Woodruff, Brigham Young

LDS Church by Location
 The Church of Jesus Christ of Latter-day Saints membership statistics

North America

Canada • Dominican Republic • Mexico • Membership Statistics (United States)

United States

Alabama • Arizona • Arkansas • California • Colorado • Florida • Georgia • Hawaii • Louisiana • Michigan • Mississippi • North Carolina • Ohio • Oklahoma • South Carolina • Tennessee • Texas • Pennsylvania

South Pacific
Marshall Islands • Tonga

Asia
Malaysia • Singapore • South Korea • Sri Lanka

Africa
Ghana

Latter Day Saint art and culture
Scouting in Utah, C.C.A. Christensen, Fireside (Mormonism), Jack Mormon, Mormon Corridor, LDS cinema, LDS fiction, Pioneer Day (Utah), Saints Unified Voices, Sunstone Magazine, Undergarment, Bloggernacle

Portrayals of Mormons in popular media
 Latter Day Saints in popular culture
"Angels in America: A Gay Fantasia on National Themes" (Tony Kushner), A Study in Scarlet (Arthur Conan Doyle), Brigham Young (movie), Go Ask Alice (Beatrice Sparks), "If This Goes On—" (Robert A. Heinlein), Jay's Journal (Beatrice Sparks), Latter Days, L. E. Modesitt, Jr., The Man with 80 Wives, Orgazmo, The Other Side of Heaven, South Park episode 411: "Probably", South Park episode 712: "All About the Mormons?", Lost Boys (novel) (Orson Scott Card), St Albion Parish News, The Memory of Earth (Orson Scott Card), Big Love (HBO Drama)

Latter Day Saint music
Collection of Sacred Hymns (Kirtland, Ohio), I Am A Child Of God, If You Could Hie to Kolob, Joy to the World (Phelps), Maren Ord, Mormon folk music, Mormon Tabernacle Choir, Music of Utah, O My Father (hymn), The Spirit of God Like a Fire Is Burning, Saints Unified Voices

Latter Day Saint films
 LDS cinema
 The Best Two Years, Brigham City, God's Army, Jack Weyland's Charly, Mobsters and Mormons, Out of Step, Pride and Prejudice: A Latter-Day Comedy, The R.M., The Singles Ward
 LDS movies
 Joseph Smith: Prophet of the Restoration, Legacy, The Testaments of One Fold and One Shepherd

Genealogy
Family History Library, GEDCOM, Genealogy

Law related to Mormonism
Edmunds Act, Edmunds–Tucker Act, Extermination Order (Mormonism), Morrill Anti-Bigamy Act, Poland Act, Reed Smoot hearings

Court decisions regarding the Latter Day Saint movement
Cannon v. United States, Clawson v. United States, Davis v. Beason, Davis v. United States (1990), Kirtland Temple Suit, Intellectual Reserve v. Utah Lighthouse Ministry, LDS Church v. United States, Reynolds v. United States, Temple Lot Case

See also

Lists
List of sects in the Latter Day Saint movement, List of Latter Day Saints, List of presidents of the Church of Jesus Christ of Latter-day Saints, Chronology of the Quorum of the Twelve Apostles (LDS Church), List of general authorities of The Church of Jesus Christ of Latter-day Saints, List of general officers of The Church of Jesus Christ of Latter-day Saints, List of area seventies of The Church of Jesus Christ of Latter-day Saints, List of stakes of The Church of Jesus Christ of Latter-day Saints, List of LDS missionary entries by country, List of references to seer stones in the Latter Day Saint movement history, List of Zion's Camp participants, List of Latter Day Saint practitioners of plural marriage, List of Joseph Smith's wives, Children of Joseph Smith, List of Brigham Young's wives,
List of temples of The Church of Jesus Christ of Latter-day Saints, List of Book of Mormon translations, List of Latter Day Saint periodicals, List of Mormon wars and massacres

 Topics
Latter Day Saint movement
Latter Day Saint movement
Latter Day Saint movement topics